Ulrich Görtz (1973) is a German mathematician specialising in arithmetic geometry.

Education and career 
From 1993 to 1997, Görtz studied mathematics at the University of Münster. He completed his PhD at the University of Cologne in 2000; his advisor was Michael Rapoport.
In 2006, Görtz habilitated at the University of Bonn.
From 2008 to 2009 he was the recipient of a Heisenberg-Stipendium of the German Research Foundation (DFG).
He received the Von-Kaven-Ehrenpreis of the DFG.
Since 2009, Görtz has been a professor at the University of Duisburg-Essen.

Books
Since August 2015, Görtz has been a member of the editorial board of the journal Results in Mathematics.

Personal life 
Görtz is an Esperantist, and had been active in the youth organisation of the German Esperanto Association.

References 

1973 births
Living people
20th-century German mathematicians
21st-century German mathematicians
Arithmetic geometers
Academic staff of the University of Bonn
Institute for Advanced Study visiting scholars
Academic staff of the University of Duisburg-Essen
Place of birth missing (living people)